Fred Geiger and Sons National Biscuit Company is a historic biscuit factory building located in downtown Evansville, Indiana. It was built in 1894, and is a two-story, brick building.  It features decorative brickwork, segmental arched openings, and limestone detailing. It housed Fred Geiger and Sons, a manufacturer for the National Biscuit Company.

It was listed on the National Register of Historic Places in 1982.

References

Industrial buildings and structures on the National Register of Historic Places in Indiana
Industrial buildings completed in 1894
Buildings and structures in Evansville, Indiana
National Register of Historic Places in Evansville, Indiana